Bulzi is a comune (municipality) in the Province of Sassari in the Italian region Sardinia, located about  north of Cagliari and about  northeast of Sassari.

Bulzi borders the following municipalities: Laerru, Perfugas, Santa Maria Coghinas, Sedini.

Sghts include the 12th century church of San Pietro del Crocifisso, or San Pietro delle Immagini, an example of Sardinian Romanesque style.

References 

Cities and towns in Sardinia